In organic chemistry, a methoxymethyl ether is a functional group with the formula , abbreviated MOM.  Methoxymethyl ethers are often employed in organic synthesis to protect alcohols.  They are usually derived from 2-methoxymethyl chloride. Closely related to MOM ethers are methoxyethoxymethoxy (MEM) protecting groups, introduced using 2-methoxyethoxymethyl chloride.  The MEM protecting groups are more easily installed and more easily removed.

Protection
Typically, the alcohol to be protected is deprotonated with a non-nucleophilic base such as N,N-diisopropylethylamine (DIPEA) in dichloromethane followed by addition of the chloromethyl reagent.<

Although not relevant to protecting groups, MOM groups are installed by reaction of chloromethyl ethers with methoxide and by the acid-catalyzed reaction of alcohols with dimethoxymethane.

Deprotection

The MOM and the MEM protecting groups can be cleaved with a range of Lewis and Bronsted acids.

Safety
Chloromethyl methyl ether and chloromethoxyethoxymethane, like other chloroalkyl ethers, are strong alkylating agents with attendant dangers. These compounds are human carcinogen.

References

Ethers